The Pacisporaceae are a family of fungi in the order Diversisporales. The family contains the single genus Pacispora. Species in this genus are widespread in distribution, and form arbuscular mycorrhiza and vesicles in roots.

References

Diversisporales
Fungus genera